Mahalleh may refer to:
Mahalleh-ye Now, Hormozgan Province
Mahalleh, Mazandaran

See also
Mahalleh is a common element in Iranian place names; see